Corey Sanders (born April 17, 1997) is an American professional basketball player for Rawlplug Sokół Łańcut of the Polish Basketball League (PLK). He played college basketball for the Rutgers Scarlet Knights. Following his junior season, Sanders declared for the 2018 NBA draft.

High school career
Sanders began his high school career at McKeel Academy in Lakeland, Florida, playing two seasons. After transferring to George W. Jenkins High School in spring of his second year, he enrolled at IMG Academy in Bradenton, Florida for his junior season. Sanders left IMG in November 2013 for family reasons, transferring to Kathleen High School in Lakeland. Sanders was ruled ineligible for the first half of his junior basketball year, averaging 15.7 points per game for Kathleen in the second half. Sanders initially returned to George Jenkins for his senior season, transferring to Faith Baptist Christian Academy in Georgia in September 2014, and finally to West Oaks Academy in Orlando by November. Sanders led West Oaks to the 2015 Sunshine Independent Athletic Association State Championship.

Sanders was childhood friends with professional basketball player Dwayne Bacon. The two were teammates at McKeel Academy and while playing AAU basketball for the Showtime Ballers.

Sanders was considered a four-star recruit, ranked 62nd in his class of 2015 by ESPN and 75th overall by Rivals.com. Sanders initially committed to the University of Central Florida in fall 2013, but de-committed in October that year. On September 4, 2014 during his senior year, Sanders committed to Rutgers.

College career
Sanders played college basketball for the Rutgers Scarlet Knights, recruited by former NBA player and coach Eddie Jordan. As a freshman, he led the team in scoring with 15.9 points per game. During the year, he was suspended four games for violating team rules. After the firing of Jordan and hiring of Steve Pikiell, Sanders considered transferring or declaring for the NBA draft but remained at Rutgers. As a sophomore, he averaged 12.8 points and 3.2 assists per game, leading all Big Ten sophomores. During his junior year, Sanders averaged 15.2 points per game in the regular season and 24.7 ppg during the Big Ten Tournament. Over three seasons, he averaged of 14.6 points, 3.6 rebounds and 3.5 assists per game. At the conclusion of his junior season, he officially declared for the 2018 NBA draft, forgoing his final season with the Scarlet Knights.

College statistics

|-
| style="text-align:left;"| 2015–16
| style="text-align:left;"| Rutgers
| 27 || 24 || 33.5 || .423 || .315 || .713 || 3.3 || 4.3 || 1.8 || .2 || 15.9
|-
| style="text-align:left;"| 2016–17
| style="text-align:left;"| Rutgers
| 33 || 31 || 30.4 || .382 || .266 || .613 || 3.2 || 3.2 || 1.3 || .5 || 12.8
|-
| style="text-align:left;"| 2017–18
| style="text-align:left;"| Rutgers
| 34 || 32 || 33.1 || .401 || .224 || .708 || 4.3 || 3.1 || 1.3 || .3 || 15.2

Professional career
On October 4, 2018, Sanders signed a deal with the Rio Grande Valley Vipers of the NBA G League He was later waived by the Vipers on November 1, 2018 without playing a game for the franchise.

On January 13, 2019, Sanders signed with the Mega Basket Georgia of the Georgia A League.

On October 3, 2019, Sanders signed with Houston Rockets' G League affiliate, the Rio Grande Valley Vipers of Rio Grande, Texas. G League contracts are one-year deals with a base salary of $7,000 per month or $35,000 over the course of a season, plus incentives. If I player is waived, all G-League teams have 2 years of returning player rights. On November 1, 2019, Sanders was released by the Vipers.

On December 12, 2019, Sanders signed a multi year deal with NBA G League team Lakeland Magic.

On January 8, 2020, Sanders signed for União Desportiva Oliveirense.

On May 6, 2020, Corey Sanders signed for Astoria Bydgoszcz.

On July 12, 2021, Sanders signed in Italy for Pallacanestro Trieste. He averaged 8.7 points and 4.6 assists per game in nie games. 

On January 3, 2022, Sanders moved to Lavrio of the Greek Basket League and the Basketball Champions League. On March 30 of the same year, he was released from the Greek club. In six league games, Sanders averaged 3.7 points, 2.8 assists and 2 rebounds, playing around 18 minutes per contest.

On November 7, 2022, he signed with Rawlplug Sokół Łańcut of the Polish Basketball League (PLK).

Personal life
Sanders lives in Lakeland, Florida, and also has a daughter.

References

21. Sanders Signs with Lakeland Magic https://www.oursportscentral.com/services/releases/magic-acquire-lakeland-native-corey-sanders/n-5579795

External links
Rutgers Scarlet Knights bio

1997 births
Living people
American expatriate basketball people in Georgia (country)
American expatriate basketball people in Greece
American expatriate basketball people in Portugal
American men's basketball players
Basketball players from Florida
Astoria Bydgoszcz players
Lakeland Magic players
Lavrio B.C. players
Point guards
Rutgers Scarlet Knights men's basketball players
Sportspeople from Lakeland, Florida